Atsushi Miyazaki (宮﨑 敦次, born December 8, 1992) is a Japanese professional baseball pitcher for the Chiba Lotte Marines in Japan's Nippon Professional Baseball.

External links

NBP

Living people
Japanese baseball players
Nippon Professional Baseball pitchers
Chiba Lotte Marines players
1992 births